Arnavutköy (meaning "Albanian village" in Turkish) is a town and rural district in Istanbul, Turkey. The district was newly formed in 2008 from the large rural part of Gaziosmanpaşa district and parts of other districts, including Çatalca. The mayor is Ahmet Haşim Baltacı of the AK Party.
It is located on the European side of Istanbul and borders the Black Sea.
The name of a neighborhood in the district, was often spelled "Hademkeui" in European sources.
Istanbul Airport is in the district.

Municipality mayors of Arnvautköy 
 2008-current Ahmet Haşim Baltacı AK Party

See also 
Karaburun, Arnavutköy,  a seaside resort

References 

 

Cities in Turkey